Roberto Succo is a 2001 French film directed by Cédric Kahn and based on the true story of the eponymous Italian serial killer Roberto Succo. The film was adapted from the book Je te tue. Histoire vraie de Roberto Succo assassin sans raison by Pascale Froment. The film was entered into the 2001 Cannes Film Festival.

Cast
 Stefano Cassetti as Roberto Succo
 Isild Le Besco as Léa
 Patrick Dell'Isola as Thomas
 Viviana Aliberti as Swiss teacher
 Estelle Perron as Céline
 Leyla Sassi as Cathy
 Catherine Decastel as Patricia
 Olivia Carbonini as Girl at the Etna
 Basile Vuillemin as L'enfant
 Brigitte Raul as Child's mother
 Marius Bertram as Cab driver
 Aymeric Chauffert as Aelaunay
 Vincent Dénériaz as Denis
 Yelda Reynaud as Mylène
 Philippe Bossard as Magistrate

References

External links

2001 films
2000s biographical films
Biographical films about serial killers
Films based on non-fiction books
Films directed by Cédric Kahn
French crime films
2000s French-language films
Cultural depictions of Italian men
Cultural depictions of male serial killers
Cultural depictions of kidnappers
Cultural depictions of rapists
2000s French films